Miodrag Koljević is a former Chargé d'affaires ad interim of Montenegro to Russia.

See also 
 Montenegro–Russia relations

References 

Montenegrin diplomats
Year of birth missing (living people)
Living people
Ambassadors of Montenegro to Russia
Place of birth missing (living people)